Vietnam participated at the 2015 Summer Universiade, in Gwangju, South Korea.

Medals by sport

Medalists

References

External links
Overview Vietnam

Nations at the 2015 Summer Universiade
Vietnam at the Summer Universiade
2015 in Vietnamese sport